Lake Mariam is roughly oval in shape and is on the northeast side of Winter Haven, Florida. The Polk County Water Atlas says sometimes the lake is known as Lake Marion, but a different Lake Marion is also in Polk County, Florida, where Lake Mariam is located. Brandywine Health Care Center, a nursing home, is a block north of the lake. On the northwest and southwest Lake Mariam is bordered by woods and on most of the east side of the lake are woods and pastureland. On the lake's southeast side is a swampy area.

There are no public swimming areas on Lake Mariam, but a public boat ramp is on the lake's north side, to the back side of Brandywine Health Care Center. Boating and fishing are allowed. The public may fish near the boat ramp or by boat. The Hook and Bullet website says the lake contains largemouth bass, bluegill and crappie.

References

Mariam